The Oklahoma Woman is a 1956 American Western film directed by Roger Corman.

Plot
The film involves the return of Steve Ward, a former gunslinger recently released from federal prison, to his hometown to claim a ranch he has inherited.  Upon his return, he finds that his hometown is divided along political lines with a group of powerful businessmen on one side and homeowners on the other. Much to his embarrassment, Steve finds that his former girlfriend, Marie "Oklahoma" Saunders, is aligned with the businessmen who are seeking even more power by placing their candidate in the senate. Aiding them is hired gunman Tom Blake.

The homeowners are led by Ed Grant whose daughter, Susan, becomes the object of Steve's attention. Meanwhile, Oklahoma, who still has strong feelings for Steve, rejects Tom's advances. Believing that Steve is keeping him from winning Oklahoma, Tom kills Ed Grant and with the help of Oklahoma, who is jealous of Steve's attention to Susan, frames Steve for the murder. The townspeople believe the story and agree that Steve should hang for the crime. Before Steve is hanged, Susan confronts Oklahoma, defeats her in a fight and forces her to sign a confession admitting that Tom is the killer.

Beaten and disgraced, Oklahoma leaves town as Tom is arrested by the sheriff for Ed Grant's murder. Susan and Steve, who have fallen in love, walk off together.

Cast
 Richard Denning as Steve Ward
 Peggie Castle as Marie "Oklahoma" Saunders
 Cathy Downs as Susan Grant
 Mike Connors as Sheriff Tom
 Tudor Owen as Ed Grant
 Martin Kingsley as Sheriff Bill Peters
 Dick Miller
 Jonathan Haze
 Paul Blaisdell as a henchman

Production
The film was originally known as The Girls of Hangtown.

It was the third of four Westerns Corman directed for ARC (who became AIP). The others were Five Guns West, Apache Woman and Gunslinger. Special effects technician Paul Blaisdell had a cameo role in the film as one of Peggy Castle's henchmen.

Apache Woman and The Oklahoma Woman came from ideas of AIP, the others were based on ideas of Corman.

The movie was made by Sunset Productions, one of independent production units that would make movies for ARC/AIP. Corman had his own unit, Paolo Alto, but worked for the other units as well. It was the first movie from Sunset; the second would be It Conquered the World, also directed by Corman.

The movie was made for $60,000 in SuperScope. Corman said he "tried to create a bigger look than the budget might indicate and save time and money in the process." He experimented shooting consecutively the components of multiple scenes that faced in one direction, then reversing the angle and shooting them all in the opposite direction. He said this made it easier for him to match backgrounds and wardrobe, "but it was too difficult for the actors and since then I've tended to shoot more in sequence."

It was the first of several collaborations between Corman and cinematographer Frederick E. West.

Among the films production challenges was addressing both Downs and Castle's insistence that they receive top billing. "Both ladies felt their names should be first" said producer Alex Gordon. "You'd think we were featuring Marlon Brando and Jack Nicholson."

Release
The film was issued on a double bill with Female Jungle.

Reception

Variety found the fight between the two female leads novel, but the movie itself was considered straight out of the oat bin. CEA Film Report was kinder, finding the movie full of action and praised the fight between Denning and Connors on the roof.

Monthly Film Bulletin said the movie was "below average... poorly photographed in SuperScope consisting of a series of loosely connected incidents which offer little scope for dramatic effect. A competent performance by Tudor Owen stands out amongst an undistinguished cast."

One reviewer called it "probably Corman's dullest film."

Copyright
The copyright in and to this motion picture is currently held by Susan Nicholson Hofheinz (Susan Hart).

References

External links

The Oklahoma Woman at TCMDB
The Oklahoma Woman at Letterbox DVD
Review of film at Variety

1956 films
American International Pictures films
1956 Western (genre) films
American Western (genre) films
Films directed by Roger Corman
Films scored by Ronald Stein
1950s English-language films
Films produced by Roger Corman
1950s American films
American black-and-white films